The Taipei Metro Zhuwei Station (formerly transliterated as Chuwei Station until 2003) is located in the sea-side district of Tamsui in New Taipei, Taiwan. It is a station on the Tamsui Line. The position of station could be traced back the same name station of defunct TRA Tamsui Line.

Station overview

The at-grade, station structure with two side platforms and two exits.

History
It was later reopened on March 28, 1997.

Station layout

First and Last Train Timing 
The first and last train timing at Zhuwei station  is as follows:

References

Tamsui–Xinyi line stations
Railway stations opened in 1997
Railway stations closed in 1988
Railway stations opened in 1932